Sampaio is a municipality in the state of Tocantins in the Northern region of Brazil.

The municipality contains 6% of the  Extremo Norte do Tocantins Extractive Reserve, created in 1992.

See also
List of municipalities in Tocantins

References

Municipalities in Tocantins